The Sixth Day may refer to:

 The 6th Day, a 2000 film featuring Arnold Schwarzenegger
 The Sixth Day: Single Collection, 2004 compilation album by Gackt
 The Sixth Day and Other Tales, a collection of stories by Primo Levi, with a story titled "The Sixth Day"
 The Sixth Day (1986 film), a 1986 film directed by Youssef Chahine